The Museum Catharijneconvent (St. Catherine's Convent Museum) is a museum of religious art in Utrecht, Netherlands. It is located in the former St. Catharine convent, having been sited there since 1979. Its collections include many artifacts from the museum of religious art of the  Catholic Archbishopric of Utrecht, located in the convent until 1979. In 2006 the convent closed for restoration. It is part of the Utrecht Museum Night.

Collection 
The museum has an extensive collection of historical and art-historical objects from the early Middle Ages to the present. The vast collection presents a picture of Protestant and Catholic art and cultural history of the Netherlands, and its impact on Dutch society. The collection includes richly illustrated manuscripts, book-bindings decorated with precious stones, richly-worked images, paintings, altarpieces, pieces of clothing and ecclesiastical objects in gold and silver. Among the highlights in the collection are the 9th-century chalice of Saint Lebuinus and carved ivories from the Lebuïnuskerk in Deventer.

External links 

  

Religious museums in the Netherlands
Museums in Utrecht (city)
Art museums and galleries in the Netherlands
Museums established in 1979
20th-century religious buildings and structures in the Netherlands